The Bride of Glomdal (Norwegian: Glomdalsbruden) is a 1926 film directed by Carl Theodor Dreyer. It is based on the stories "Glomdalsbruden" and "Eline Vangen" by Jacob Breda Bull.

Cast
 Einar Sissener as Tore Braaten 
 Tove Tellback as Berit Glomgaarden 
 Stub Wiberg as Ola Glomgaarden 
 Harald Stormoen as Jakob Braaten 
 Alfhild Stormoen as Kari Braaten, his wife 
 Oscar Larsen as Berger Haugsett 
 Einar Tveito as Gjermund Haugsett, his son 
 Rasmus Rasmussen as the priest 
 Sophie Reimers as the priest's wife
 Julie Lampe as Old Guri

References

External links 
 

1926 films
Films directed by Carl Theodor Dreyer
1926 romantic drama films
Norwegian silent feature films
Norwegian black-and-white films
Norwegian romantic drama films
Silent romantic drama films